Anne of York may refer to:

 Anne of York, Duchess of Exeter (1439–1476), daughter of Richard Plantagenet, 3rd Duke of York and Cecily Neville; wife first of Henry Holland, 3rd Duke of Exeter, second of Thomas St. Leger
 Anne of York (daughter of Edward IV) (1475–1511), daughter of Edward IV, King of England, and Elizabeth Woodville; wife of Thomas Howard, later 3rd Duke of Norfolk